Manja Kuruvi is a 2022 Indian Tamil-language drama film directed by Arangan Chinnathambi and starring Kishore. It was released on 2 December 2022.

Cast
Kishore
Neeraja
Rajanayagam
Ganja Karuppu
Thamizh

Production
Kishore opted not use a stunt double when filming action scenes for the film. During the promotion of the film, the film's lead actress Neerja was seen sticking the poster of the film on roadside walls.

Reception
The film was released on 2 December 2022 across Tamil Nadu. A reviewer from Dina Thanthi noted that the film was "disappointing". A reviewer from Maalai Malar gave the film 2.25 out of 5 stars, and noted it was "watchable".

References

External links

2022 films
2020s Tamil-language films